Battle of Piatka, (February 2, 1593) was a battle of the Kosiński Uprising. Polish–Lithuanian Commonwealth forces under the command of Janusz Ostrogski defeated the Cossacks forces under the command of Krzysztof Kosiński.

References
Leszek Podhorodecki: Sicz zaporoska. Warszawa: Książka i Wiedza, 1978.
Władysław A. Serczyk: Na dalekiej Ukrainie: Dzieje Kozaczyzny do 1648 roku. Wydawnictwo Literackie, 1984. .

Piatka
Piatka
Piatka
Zhytomyr Oblast
1593 in Europe
16th century in Ukraine
Piatka
History of Zhytomyr Oblast